The Maadiran Group is an Iranian conglomerate group composed of a public company as well as several fully private entities. The group is a multi-generational family company with no links to the government of the Islamic Republic of Iran. The core business of the Maadiran Group revolves around technology manufacturing, distribution, solutions and support services. It has also expanded into banking, finance, property development, biodegradables and plastics manufacturing. The manufacturing arm of the group held a successful IPO in 2018 and it trades under the ticker "مادیرا" on Iran's Farabourse.

The Maadiran Group was established in 1964 and was formerly known as Iran Office Machines Company Ltd. It is an exclusive distributor for Sharp Corporation, LG Group, AOC, Dell, Asus, Acer, CTS Electronics, TCL, Optoma, Wacom, Olivetti, and Epson as well as a number of other brands within Iran. Maadiran also has several own-brand product lines including a range of specialised technical solutions and consumables operating under the brand name Meva, a range of AV and home appliance products being sold under X-Vision brand, lifestyle products under the xelle brand, and biodegradable products under Kisabz. In 2013 it launched a property development arm, Simorgh Property Development, which focuses on the affordable and middle-income segments of the Iranian market.

Maadiran brand

The original Maadiran logo consisted of two bars with the company name written in both Persian and English inside the bars. This logo was first used by the group in 2000 and was the first logo in which the company's new name, 'Maadiran', appeared.

References

  Maadiran is Iran's top IT company for 2008
  Maadiran is Iran's top IT company for 2007
  Maadiran is Iran's top IT company for 2005
  Maadiran begins exporting LG to surrounding countries & Market Share
 Maadiran launches MEVA in Iran
 News about Maadiran
 News about Maadiran shop product tcl
 News about Maadiran shop product xvision
 LG partners with Maadiran to make mobile phones
 Company Introduction

Conglomerate companies established in 1964
Electronics companies of Iran
Manufacturing companies based in Tehran
Conglomerate companies of Iran
1964 establishments in Iran
Iranian brands